Amherst Township may refer to the following townships in the US:

 Amherst Township, Cherokee County, Iowa
 Amherst Township, Fillmore County, Minnesota
 Amherst Township, Lorain County, Ohio

See also
 Amherst County
 Amherst (disambiguation)